Cowton may refer to:

People
Gary Cowton (born 1952), former Australian rules footballer
Robert Cowton, Franciscan theologian active at the University of Oxford in the fourteenth century

Places
Three villages and civil parishes in the district of Hambleton in Richmondshire, North Yorkshire, England
East Cowton
North Cowton
South Cowton

See also
Cowton Burn, stream that rises in the Grampian Mountains, west of Netherley, Aberdeenshire, Scotland
Cowton railway station, disused station on the East Coast Main Line, near the village of East Cowton
North and South Cowton Community Primary School, located in North Cowton
South Cowton Castle, 15th Century fortified dwelling house in South Cowton